David Tindle  (born 29 April 1932) is a British painter who was made a Royal Academician in 1979. He is a Fellow of St Edmund Hall where several of his paintings are in the Senior Common Room. In the Old Dining Hall hangs his portrait of the former Principal Justin Gosling.

Early life 
David Tindle was born 29 April 1932, in Huddersfield, Yorkshire. He studied at Coventry School of Art from 1945 to 1947.

Teaching career 
 1959 – 1972 Tutor, Hornsey College of Art and Byam Shaw School of Art 
 1972 – 1983 Tutor, Royal College of Art 
 1985 – 1987 Ruskin Master of Drawing, Oxford University

References

External links 
 
 Profile: David Tindle Royal Academy of Arts

1932 births
20th-century English painters
English male painters
21st-century English painters
Academics of the Byam Shaw School of Art
Academics of the Royal College of Art
Alumni of Coventry School of Art and Design
Living people
People from Huddersfield
Royal Academicians
Fellows of St Edmund Hall, Oxford
Artists from Yorkshire
20th-century English male artists
21st-century English male artists